The Grand Junction Waterworks Company was a utility company supplying water to parts of west London in England. The company was formed as an offshoot of the Grand Junction Canal Company in 1811 and became part of the publicly owned Metropolitan Water Board in 1904.

Origins
The company was created in 1811 to take advantage of a clause in the Grand Junction Canal Company's Act which allowed them to supply water brought by the canal from the River Colne and River Brent, and from a reservoir (now Ruislip Lido) in north-west Middlesex supplied by land drainage. It was thought that these waters would be better than those of the Thames, but in fact they were found to be of poor quality and insufficient to meet demand. After trying to resolve these problems the company resorted to taking its supply from the River Thames at a point near Chelsea Hospital

Infrastructure

The Grand Junction Waterworks Company built a pumping station near Kew Bridge at Brentford in 1838 to house its new steam pump and two similar pumps purchased from Boulton, Watt and Company in 1820. The water was taken from the middle of the river and pumped into filtering reservoirs and to a 200 ft high water tower to provide gravity feed to the area. A six and seven mile main took the water to a reservoir on Campden Hill near Notting Hill capable of containing 6 million gallons. The Kew Bridge facilities now house the London Museum of Water & Steam.

In the 1850s, the quality of drinking water was of public concern. Charles Dickens took an interest in the topic and, in carrying out research, he visited the Kew Bridge Pumping Station in March 1850. He recorded details of his visit in his campaigning journal Household Words, in an article published in April 1850 entitled "The Troubled Water Question". The report of the epidemiologist John Snow on an outbreak of cholera pinpointed a workhouse in Soho which escaped the contagion because it was supplied by Grand Junction rather than the other local supply. The Metropolis Water Act 1852 was enacted "to make provision for securing the supply to the Metropolis of pure and wholesome water". Under the Act, it became unlawful for any water company to extract water for domestic use from the tidal reaches of the Thames after 31 August 1855, and from 31 December 1855 all such water was required to be "effectually filtered". Accordingly, new waterworks had to be constructed further up river and the Grand Junction Waterworks Company was one of three companies that opened new facilities at Hampton between Molesey and Sunbury Locks in the 1850s. The company took its water from an island in the Thames that thereby acquired its present name, Grand Junction Isle.

See also
London water supply infrastructure

References

London water infrastructure
British companies established in 1811
Former water company predecessors of Thames Water
1811 establishments in England